The Sleeping Partner is a 1956 thriller novel by the British writer Winston Graham.

Film adaptation
In 1962 it was adapted into a film Carnival of Crime starring Jean-Pierre Aumont and Alix Talton.

References

Bibliography
 Woods, Tim. Who's Who of Twentieth Century Novelists. Routledge, 2008.

1956 British novels
Novels by Winston Graham
British thriller novels
British novels adapted into films
Hodder & Stoughton books